Pressure retarded osmosis (PRO) is a technique to separate a solvent (for example, fresh water) from a solution that is more concentrated (e.g. sea water) and also pressurized. A semipermeable membrane allows the solvent to pass to the concentrated solution side by osmosis. The technique can be used to generate power from the salinity gradient energy resulting from the difference in the salt concentration between sea and river water.
In PRO, the water potential between fresh water and sea water corresponds to a pressure of 26 bars. This pressure is equivalent to a column of water (hydraulic head) 270 meters high.
However, the optimal working pressure is  only half of this, 11 to 15 bar.

History 

This method of generating power was invented by Prof. Sidney Loeb in 1973 at the Ben-Gurion University of the Negev, Beersheba, Israel.

In 2014 researchers verified that 95% of a PRO system's theoretical power output can be produced with a membrane that is half (or less) the size needed for achieving 100%. Output is proportional to the salinity. Desalination yields very salty brine, while treated municipal wastewater has relatively little salt. Combining those streams could produce energy to power both facilities. However, powering an existing wastewater treatment plant by mixing treated wastewater with seawater could require a membrane area of 2.5 million square meters.

To deal with these membrane requirements, scientists are working on rolled membranes  that will take up much less space.

Process 

PRO uses a water–permeable membrane with an osmotic pressure difference to drive water flux from a low–concentration (LC) "diluate" stream, to a be drawn into a slightly pressurized higher–concentration (HC). An energy recovery device on this stream provides the energy output, and must exceed the pumping pressure input for net power production.

Testing 

The world's first osmotic plant with capacity of 10 kW was opened by Statkraft, a state-owned hydropower company, on 24 November 2009 in Tofte, Norway. In January 2014 Statkraft terminated their osmosis pilot project  due to economic feasibility concerns.

It is estimated that each year 1600 TWh could be generated worldwide, and 12 TWh in Norway, sufficient to meet 10% of Norway's total demand for electricity.

In Denmark, SaltPower is building the worlds first commercial osmitic power plant using high salinity brine.

See also 

 Electrodialysis reversal (EDR)
 Forward osmosis
 Green energy
 Osmotic power
 Osmotic pressure
 Renewable energy
 Reverse electrodialysis (RED)
 Reverse osmosis
 Semipermeable membrane
 Van 't Hoff factor

References

Further reading 

 
 
 
 
 
 
 

Fuel cells
Sustainable technologies
Sustainable energy
Energy conversion
Israeli inventions
Membrane technology